Federico Roberto Edwards (25 January 1931 in Santa Fe, Argentina – 13 November 2016) was an Argentine football defender who played for Argentina in the 1958 FIFA World Cup. He also played for Boca Juniors.

References

External links
 

1931 births
2016 deaths
Argentine footballers
Argentina international footballers
Association football defenders
Boca Juniors footballers
Talleres de Remedios de Escalada managers
1958 FIFA World Cup players
Argentine people of British descent
Footballers from Santa Fe, Argentina